Sean Lemmens (born 2 November 1994) is an Australian rules footballer who plays for Gold Coast Football Club in the Australian Football League. He is of Indigenous Australian heritage.

Early career
Lemmens was born into a family of Indigenous Australian descent (Tiwi). He began playing junior football for the Salisbury Football Club and moved to the Port Adelaide Magpies. He progressed his way through the junior ranks at Port Adelaide before solidifying a reserves spot in the 2013. He debuted for the Magpies senior team in the final round of the 2013 SANFL season. He was also selected to represent South Australia in the 2013 AFL Under 18 Championships, where he was noticed by Gold Coast defensive coach, Dean Solomon.

Leading into the 2013 AFL Draft, Lemmens was considered by some to be a rookie chance at best. He was drafted with the 27th pick in the 2013 National Draft by the Gold Coast Suns.

AFL career
Lemmens made his senior debut for the Suns against Richmond Tigers in Round 1 of the 2014 season.

Statistics
 Statistics are correct to the end of round 3, 2022

|-
|- style="background-color: #EAEAEA"
! scope="row" style="text-align:center" | 2014
|style="text-align:center;"|
| 40 || 18 || 3 || 0 || 145 || 90 || 235 || 40 || 41 || 0.2 || 0.0 || 8.1 || 5.0 || 13.1 || 2.2 || 2.3
|-
! scope="row" style="text-align:center" | 2015
|style="text-align:center;"|
| 40 || 18 || 3 || 4 || 102 || 89 || 191 || 51 || 52 || 0.2 || 0.2 || 5.7 || 4.9 || 10.6 || 2.8 || 2.9
|- style="background-color: #EAEAEA"
! scope="row" style="text-align:center" | 2016
|style="text-align:center;"|
| 23 || 13 || 1 || 2 || 93 || 76 || 169 || 43 || 30 || 0.1 || 0.2 || 7.2 || 5.8 || 13.0 || 3.3 || 2.3
|-
! scope="row" style="text-align:center" | 2017
|style="text-align:center;"|
| 23 || 20 || 9 || 13 || 124 || 122 || 246 || 48 || 60 || 0.5 || 0.7 || 6.2 || 6.1 || 12.3 || 2.4 || 3.0
|- style="background-color: #EAEAEA"
! scope="row" style="text-align:center" | 2018
|style="text-align:center;"|
| 23 || 10 || 1 || 7 || 65 || 48 || 113 || 22 || 37 || 0.1 || 0.7 || 6.5 || 4.8 || 11.3 || 2.2 || 3.7
|-
! scope="row" style="text-align:center" | 2019
|style="text-align:center;"|
| 23 || 8 || 4 || 1 || 55 || 29 || 84 || 15 || 36 || 0.5 || 0.1 || 6.9 || 3.6 || 10.5 || 1.9 || 4.5
|- style="background-color: #EAEAEA"
! scope="row" style="text-align:center" | 2020
|style="text-align:center;"|
| 23 || 6 || 4 || 0 || 29 || 19 || 48 || 7 || 9 || 0.7 || 0.0 || 4.8 || 3.2 || 8.0 || 1.2 || 1.5
|-
! scope="row" style="text-align:center" | 2021
|style="text-align:center;"|
| 23 || 21 || 0 || 0 || 196 || 72 || 268 || 76 || 44 || 0.0 || 0.0 || 9.3 || 3.4 || 12.8 || 3.6 || 2.1
|- style="background-color: #EAEAEA"
! scope="row" style="text-align:center" | 2022
|style="text-align:center;"|
| 23 || 3 || 0 || 0 || 20 || 12 || 32 || 9 || 5 || 0.0 || 0.0 || 6.7 || 4.0 || 10.7 || 3.0 || 1.7
|-
|- class="sortbottom"
! colspan=3| Career
! 117
! 25
! 27
! 829
! 557
! 1386
! 311
! 314
! 0.2
! 0.2
! 7.1
! 4.8
! 11.8
! 2.7
! 2.7
|}

Notes

Personal life
Lemmens' partner is former Gold Coast teammate Izak Rankine's cousin and Lemmens' daughter is Rankine's second niece.

References

External links

1994 births
Living people
Gold Coast Football Club players
Port Adelaide Football Club (SANFL) players
Port Adelaide Football Club players (all competitions)
Australian rules footballers from South Australia
Indigenous Australian players of Australian rules football
Tiwi Islands people